The 1993–94 FIBA European League, also shortened to 1993–94 FIBA EuroLeague, was the 37th installment of the European top-tier level professional club competition for basketball clubs (now called EuroLeague). It began on September 9, 1993, and ended on April 21, 1994. The competition's Final Four was held at Tel Aviv.

Competition system 
 42 teams (the cup title holder, national domestic league champions, and a variable number of other clubs from the most important national domestic leagues) played knock-out rounds on a home and away basis. The aggregate score of both games decided the winner.
 The sixteen remaining teams after the knock-out rounds entered the Regular Season Group Stage, divided into two groups of eight teams, playing a round-robin. The final standing was based on individual wins and defeats. In the case of a tie between two or more teams after the group stage, the following criteria were used to decide the final classification: 1) number of wins in one-to-one games between the teams; 2) basket average between the teams; 3) general basket average within the group.
 The top four teams from each group after the Regular Season Group Stage qualified for a quarterfinal playoff (X-pairings, best of 3 games).
 The four winners of the quarterfinal playoff qualified for the final stage (Final Four), which was played at a predetermined venue.

First round 

|}

*Kalev withdrew before the first leg and Croatia Osiguranje Split received a forfeit (20-0) in both games.

Second round 

|}

*RTI Minsk refused to play the second leg and FC Barcelona received a forfeit (20-0) in this game.

Automatically qualified to the group stage
  Limoges CSP (title holder)
  Real Madrid Teka
  Buckler Beer Bologna
  Olympiacos

Group stage 
If one or more clubs are level on won-lost record, tiebreakers are applied in the following order:
 Head-to-head record in matches between the tied clubs
 Overall point difference in games between the tied clubs
 Overall point difference in all group matches (first tiebreaker if tied clubs are not in the same group)
 Points scored in all group matches
 Sum of quotients of points scored and points allowed in each group match

Quarterfinals 
Seeded teams played games 2 and 3 at home.

|}

Final four

Semifinals 
April 19, Yad Eliyahu Arena, Tel Aviv

|}

3rd place game 
April 21, Yad Eliyahu Arena, Tel Aviv

|}

Final 
April 21, Yad Eliyahu Arena, Tel Aviv

|}

Final standings

Awards

1994 FIBA European League All-Final Four Team

References

External links 
 1993–94 FIBA European League
 1993–94 FIBA European League

 
1993-1994